Otto Pretzl (Ingolstadt, 20 April 1893 – Sevastopol, 28 October 1941) was a German Arabist-orientalist, who specialized in Koranic studies.

From 1912 he studied at the Pontifical Gregorian University in Rome, and in 1920 was ordained as a priest in Freising. Afterwards, he studied theology and Oriental languages at the University of Munich, where he later qualified as a lecturer in Old Testament exegesis (1928) and Islamic and Semitic languages (1933). In 1934 he became an associate professor at the university, attaining a full professorship during the following year. In 1937 he became a member of the Bavarian Academy of Sciences. 

In 1938 Pretzl documented the emergence of a de facto islamic canonical text, namely the 1924 Cairo edition of the Quran. Pretzl listed the variants between the orthography of the Cairo text and the recommendations of Andalusian Qurʾān reciter, Abu ‘Amr al-Dani (d. 1053). 

Otto Pretzl died in a plane crash in 1941.

Selected works 
 Die frühislamische Attributenlehre, 1940 – Early Islamic attributes doctrine.
 Die Fortführung des Apparatus Criticus zum Koran 1934; Continuation of the critical apparatus of the Koran.

References 

German orientalists
German Arabists
People from Ingolstadt
Ludwig Maximilian University of Munich alumni
Academic staff of the Ludwig Maximilian University of Munich
1893 births
1941 deaths
German male non-fiction writers